Taylor M. Benson (November 2, 1926September 25, 2004) was a member of the Wisconsin State Senate.

Biography
Benson was born in Milwaukee, Wisconsin. to Marguerite Regan and Charles Carpenter Benson. He had a brother John, born 5 years earlier. He attended high school in Los Angeles, California before graduating from the University of Notre Dame. During World War II and the Korean War, he served in the United States Army Air Forces and the United States Air Force. He was a journalist by trade.

Benson was a member of the Air Force Association, the Reserve Officers Association, the Sons of the American Revolution, the Christian Family Movement, the Confraternity of Christian Doctrine and the National Press Club.

Benson married Carol Marie Bauhs in January 1954. Together, they had four children: Kevin Charles, Mary Victoria, Geoffrey Regan, and Pamela Maureen.

Political career
Benson was elected to the Senate in 1964 and became Assistant Minority Leader. He was a Democrat.

References

1922 births
1996 deaths
20th-century American politicians
20th-century American non-fiction writers
Politicians from Milwaukee
Politicians from Los Angeles
Democratic Party Wisconsin state senators
Journalists from Wisconsin
Military personnel from Wisconsin
United States Army Air Forces soldiers
United States Air Force airmen
United States Army Air Forces personnel of World War II
United States Air Force personnel of the Korean War
University of Notre Dame alumni
20th-century American journalists
American male journalists
20th-century American male writers